The Revolutionary Union for Internationalist Solidarity (abbreviated as ), also known as RUIS is an anarchist military unit, part of the International Freedom Battalion involved in the Syrian Civil War. It was founded in 2015 and is composed mostly of Greek volunteers. In 2017, Greek authorities estimated the size of the group at five or six.

History 
The group launched a statement through Indymedia announcing its founding, the statement was dated April 2015. In that statement the organization claims that they are Greek internationalist anarchists who come to Rojava in response to the call for volunteers by MLKP made in January, to form an internationalist brigade to defend the Rojava Revolution, along with the YPG and YPJ, against the Islamic State of Iraq and the Levant. They are one of the first former members of the International Freedom Battalion with MLKP, the United Freedom Forces, TIKKO and the Spanish Reconstrucción Comunista.

In an interview to RUIS, obtained by the alternative portal Apatris.info in October 2015, a member of the group explains that the Revolutionary Union for Internationalist Solidarity "is an organization that fights for the world social revolution." The same interview reveals that their participants are anarcho-communists and anarchists from Greece. He suggests that in concert, the group aims at effective solidarity in the field of international armed conflicts. He also claims that they fight on the side of the oppressed classes for social liberation and "against the domination of States and Capital" denoting a radical anti-capitalist position. And he adds that "effective solidarity must have the characteristics of social struggle at all points of the conflict, breaking the limits of tyranny, oppression and exploitation."

On 3 April 2017, the group reappeared on social networks on the occasion of a campaign of solidarity with the anarchist movement of Athens, launched through Twitter by the International Revolutionary People's Guerrilla Forces (IRPGF). This caught the attention of some Greek media, sending their messages even to State security and intelligence services which affirmed to the press their concerns about the return of the fighters to the country.

In February 2018, Icelandic RUIS and MLKP fighter Haukur Hilmarsson was killed in combat while fighting against the Turkish military operation in Afrin.

Ideology
The group is based on the ideals of anarcho-communism, also called libertarian communism, a philosophical and economic major trend within anarchism whose main exponents were Carlo Cafiero, Piotr Kropotkin, Errico Malatesta and Nestor Makhno among others. The group could also be classified as especifist. Although its especifist tendency, it advocates for the left unity and coexistence with proletarian movements like Marxism-Leninism.

RUIS was the first anarchist unit to join the International Freedom Battalion, succeeded by the IRPGF, but previously to the latter, the Turkish vegan anarchist unit Sosyal Isyan (Social Rebellion) part of the United Freedom Forces.

See also 
 Rojava Revolution
 International Freedom Battalion
 International Revolutionary People's Guerrilla Forces

References

Bibliography

External links
 Twitter
 

Anarchism in Syria
Anarchist militant groups
Anarchist organizations in Greece
Anti-ISIL factions in Syria
Communist militant groups
Expatriate units and formations in the Syrian civil war
Far-left politics in Greece
Guerrilla organizations
International Freedom Battalion
Left-wing militant groups in Greece
Resistance movements
Revolutionary movements